Krupp can refer to:

The Krupp family, owners of the German industrial conglomerate Friedrich Krupp AG Hoesch-Krupp, commonly known as Krupp
Thyssen-Krupp, successor company
Friedrich Krupp Germaniawerft, shipyard
Krupp Trial, post World War II war crimes trial involving the directors of the Krupp group
Lex Krupp, law concerning the succession of ownership of the Krupp group through the Krupp family line
Directors, owners and founders of the Krupp group
Friedrich Krupp
Alfried Krupp von Bohlen und Halbach
Friedrich Alfred Krupp
Bertha Krupp
See also :Category:Krupp
Other
Krupp, Washington, a town in the USA
Die Krupps, German industrial rock band
Krupp Diamond
Other people
Uwe Krupp, German ice hockey player
Killer Karl Krupp,  Dutch professional wrestler
Ed Krupp, American astronomer
Fred Krupp, American environmentalist
Haymon Krupp, American oilman and businessman
Bjorn Krupp, American-German ice hockey player, son of Uwe Krupp
Hans-Jürgen Krupp, German politician (SPD), professor and economist

Other uses
Mr. Benjamin Krupp, a character in the Captain Underpants series by Dav Pilkey

See also
Krups